Hundhotellet – En mystisk historia is a Swedish animated detective mystery/surreal film from 2000, directed by Per Åhlin who also wrote the script together with Hans Åke Gabrielsson. The film is traditionally animated by hand, the last film in Sweden to have been produced in that style.

Plot
An anthropomorphic dog named Sture is talked into taking a trip to Paris by his friend Picasso. After a series of misfortunes they end up in Scotland instead, staying at a mysterious hotel. Picasso remains ignorant and believes they are in Paris. Sture befriends the novelist Miss Mops and gets to meet several mysterious characters living in the hotel as strange events revolving around an Egyptian artifact start to take place.

Voice cast
Hans Alfredson as Sture
Margreth Weivers as Miss Mops
Jan Mybrand as Picasso the dachshund
Stig Grybe as Dr. Dunkelspiel, the villain
Tomas von Brömssen as the Hotel Owner
Björn Kjellman as Ke Ping, the wizard 
Rolf Skoglund as Baskerville Jr. 
Johan Rabaeus as Mr Big, the American
Johan Ulveson as Waiter 1
Bo Christer Hjelte as Waiter 2
Peter Harryson as Jägmästarn, a hunter 
Pernilla Wahlgren as the Hitchhicker 
Karin Gidfors as the Kitchen Girl / Cleaner

Response
The film received a very positive response from critics.

References

External links

Swedish animated films
2000 films
Films directed by Per Åhlin
2000s Swedish films
Zentropa films